This is a summary of the electoral history of David Lange, Prime Minister of New Zealand (1984–89), Leader of the Labour Party (1983–89), Member of Parliament for Mangere (1977–96).

Parliamentary elections

1975 election

1977 by-election

1978 election

1981 election

1984 election

1987 election

1990 election

1993 election

Leadership elections

1979 Deputy-leadership election

1980 Leadership election

1981 Deputy-leadership election

1983 Leadership election

1988 Leadership election

Notes

References

Lange, David